The Whitehead Lifesaving Station was a maritime rescue facility on Whitehead Island, an island off the coast of St. George, Maine at the mouth of Penobscot Bay.   Established in 1874 by the United States Life-Saving Service, its original building is one of the best-preserved of the five stations built by the service on the coast of Maine and New Hampshire at that time.  The station was in active use until the 1940s, and is now privately owned.  It was listed on the National Register of Historic Places in 1988.

Description and history
Whitehead Island is a  island off the northeastern coast of St. George, near the southwestern approach to Penobscot Bay. In addition to the former lifesaving station, the island is also home to Whitehead Light, located at its southeastern point. The lifesaving station is located near the southwestern point of the island, between it and a small peninsula jutting to the south. Its historic features include the original 1874 building, located near the water, and a 1922 residential structure set further inland. Between these two structures is a small parade ground which was used by the station crews for drills; part of this ground includes the foundation point where a "wreck pole" was mounted, simulating the mast of a ship. The 1874 building is a two-story rectangular wood frame structure with decorative Italianate features, while the 1922 residence is a modest vernacular two-story building with a hip roof.

The original 1874 building was probably designed by Francis Chandler, who was employed in the Office of the Supervising Architect of the United States Treasury Department. The 1922 building was probably designed by Victor Mendelhoff, the principal architect of the United States Life-Saving Service from 1896. The Life-Saving Service was merged into the United States Coast Guard, which closed the facility about 1944, selling it into private ownership. Most of Whitehead Island is privately owned, with a conservation easement protecting most of it. The facilities of the station are rented by the owners to the Pine Island Camp, which owns the lighthouse complex and conducts trips to the island.

See also
National Register of Historic Places listings in Knox County, Maine

References

Government buildings on the National Register of Historic Places in Maine
National Register of Historic Places in Knox County, Maine
Queen Anne architecture in Maine
Colonial Revival architecture in Maine
Buildings and structures completed in 1874
Closed facilities of the United States Coast Guard
Life-Saving Service stations
Life-Saving Service stations on the National Register of Historic Places
Historic districts on the National Register of Historic Places in Maine
1874 establishments in Maine